Countries belonging to the Commonwealth of Nations typically exchange High Commissioners, rather than Ambassadors. Though there are a few technical and historical differences, they are now in practice the same office. The following persons have served as British High Commissioners to the People's Republic of Bangladesh.

List of High Commissioners

1972–1975: Anthony Golds
1975–1978: Barry Smallman
1978–1980: Stephen Miles
1980–1981: Sir Michael Scott
1981–1983: Sir Frank Mills
1983–1989: Sir Terence Streeton
1989–1993: Sir Colin Imray
1993–1996: Peter Fowler
1996–2000: David Walker
2000–2004: David Carter
2004–2008: Anwar Choudhury
2008–2011: Stephen Evans
2011–2015: Robert Gibson
2016–2019: Alison Blake

2019–: Robert Chatterton Dickson

References

External links

UK and Bangladesh, gov.uk

Bangladesh
 
United Kingdom
Bangladesh and the Commonwealth of Nations
United Kingdom and the Commonwealth of Nations